This is a list of architecture schools at colleges and universities around the world.

An architecture school (also known as a school of architecture or college of architecture), is an institution specializing in architectural education.

Africa

Algeria
 Département d'architecture de l'université Benyoucef Benkhedda Algiers
 Département d'architecture de l'université Amar Telidji de Laghouat
 Département d'Architecture de l'université L'arbi Ben Mhidi Oum El Bouaghi
 Département d'architecture de l'université Med Khieder de Biskra
 Département d'Architecture de Sétif
 Département d'architecture du centre universitaire L'Arbi Tbessi de Tébessa
 École Polytechnique d'Architecture et d'Urbanisme (EPAU) d'Alger
 Institut d'architecture de Batna
 Institut d'architecture et d'urbanisme de l'université Saad Dahleb Blida
 Institut d'architecture de Mostaganem
 Institut d'architecture de Tizi-Ouzou
 Institut d'architecture de Tlemcen (Université d'Abou Bakr Belkaid, faculté des sciences de l'ingénieur), Tlemcen
 Institut d'Architecture et d'Urbanisme (IAUC) de Constantine

Cameroon
 École Supérieure Speciale d'Architecture du Cameroun (ESSACA) Yaoundé
 Université de Douala, Institut des Beaux-Arts.
 Université de Dschang, Institut des Beaux-Arts de Foumban.

Democratic Republic of the Congo
 Institut Supérieure d'Architecture Et d'Urbanisme (I.S.A.U), Gombe, Kinshasa
 Faculty of Architecture and Urbanism of the Université Catholique de Bukavu (UCB), Bukavu, South Kivu
 Université Panafricaine du Congo (U.PA.C), Mongafula, Kinshasa
 Académie des Beaux Arts (A.B.A), Gombe, Kinshasa
 Universite Kongo (U.K), Mbanza-ngungu, Kongo Central
 Universite Nouveaux Horizons (U.N.H), Lubumbashi, Haut-Katanga
 Université de Notre-Dame du Kasai (U.KA), Kananga, Kasaï-Central
 Institut national des bâtiments et travaux publics (INBTP) de Ngaliema, Kinshasa

Ghana
Department of architecture, Faculty of Art and Built Environment, Kwame Nkrumah Un of Science and Technology, Kumasi
Department of architecture of the Faculty of Art and built engineering,university of  Ghana, Accra

Egypt
 Department of Architecture of the Faculty of Engineering, Al Azhar University, Cairo and Qena
 Department of Architecture in the German University (GUC), Cairo
 Department of Architecture of the Faculty of Engineering (HTI), 10th of Ramadan City
 Department of Architecture of the Faculty of Engineering, Ain Shams University, Abbaseya, Cairo
 Department of Architecture of the Faculty of Engineering, Alexandria University, Alexandria
 Department of Architecture of the Faculty of Engineering, Arab Academy for Science and Technology and Maritime Transport, Cairo and Alexandria
 Department of Architecture of the Faculty of Engineering, Suez Canal University, Ismailia
 Department of Architecture of the Faculty of Engineering, Assiut University, Assiut
 Department of Architecture of the Faculty of Engineering, Behira Higher Institute, BHI, Kilo 47 Alexandria, Cairo Desert Road
 Department of Architecture of the Faculty of Engineering, Benha University, Shoubra
 Department of Architecture of the Faculty of Engineering, Cairo Higher Institute, CHI, New Cairo, Cairo
 Department of Architecture of the Faculty of Engineering, Cairo University, Giza
 Department of Architecture of the Faculty of Engineering, El Shorouk Academy, Cairo, El Shorouk
 Department of Architecture of the Faculty of Engineering, Helwan University, Mattareya, Cairo
 Department of Architecture of the Faculty of Engineering, Higher Technological Institute (HTI), 10th of Ramadan City
 Department of Architecture of the Faculty of Engineering, Mansoura University, Mansoura
 Department of Architecture of the Faculty of Engineering, Menoufia University, Menoufia
 Department of Architecture of the Faculty of Engineering, Misr International University,  Cairo
 Department of Architecture of the Faculty of Engineering, Misr University for Science and Technology (MUST), 6 October City
 Department of Architecture of the Faculty of Engineering, Modern Academy for Engineering and Technology, Maadi
 Department of Architecture of the Faculty of Engineering, MSA University, 6 October City, Cairo
 Department of Architecture of the Faculty of Engineering, Pharos University in Alexandria, Alexandria
 Department of Architecture of the Faculty of Engineering, Tanta University, Tanta
 Department of Architecture of the Faculty of Engineering, Zagazig University, Zagazig
 Department of Architecture of the Faculty of Fine Arts, Alexandria University, Alexandria 
 Department of Architecture of the Faculty of Fine Arts, Helwan University, Zamalek, Cairo
 Department of Architecture of the Faculty of Fine Arts, Minia University, Minia 
 Department of Architecture, School of Engineering, Université Française d'Égypte,  Cairo
 Department of Architecture, School of Engineering, Future University in Egypt, FUE, Cairo
 Department of Construction and Architectural Engineering American University in Cairo, (AUC), Kattameya, Helwan
Department of Architecture of the Faculty of Engineering, British University in Egypt, Sherouq

Kenya
 Jomo Kenyatta University of Agriculture and Technology, School of Architecture and Building Sciences, Department of Architecture
 Technical University of Kenya, Faculty of Engineering and the Built Environment, Department of Architecture and Environmental Design
 Technical University of Mombasa, Faculty of Engineering and Technology, Department of Building and Civil Engineering
 University of Nairobi, Department of Architecture, Faculty of Architecture and Design

Libya
 Benghazi University, Faculty of Engineering, Department of Architecture and Urban Planning, Benghazi
 Omar Al-Mukhtar University, Faculty of Art and Architecture, Department of Architecture and Planning, Derna, Al Fatah branch, Derna
 University of Tripoli, School of Applied Sciences, Department of Architecture and Civil Engineering, Tripoli

Mauritius
 École nationale supérieure d'architecture de Nantes Mauritius (ENSA Nantes Mauritius), UNICITI, Quatre Bornes

Ucsi University /Jr School Port Louis

Morocco
 Ecole d'Architecture de Casablanca, Casablanca
 Ecole Nationale d'Architecture, Rabat
 Ecole Supérieure de Design e des Arts Visuels Casablanca, Casablanca

Nigeria

Universities
 Abia State University, Uturu, Abia State
 Abubakar Tafawa Ballewa University, Bauchi State
 Ahmadu Bello University, Zaria, Kaduna State
 Ambrose Alli University, Ekpoma, Edo State
 Anambra State University of Science and Technology, Anambra State
 Bells University of Technology, Ota, Ogun State
 Crescent University, Abeokuta, Ogun State
 Covenant University, Ota, Ogun State
 Cross River University of Technology, Cross River State
 Enugu State University of Science and Technology, Enugu State
 Federal University of Agriculture Makurdi, Beneu State
 Federal University of Technology, Akure, Ondo State
 Federal University of Technology Minna, Niger State
 Federal University of Technology Yola, Adamawa State
 Imo State University, Imo State
 Joseph Ayo Babalola University, Ipo Arakeji and Ikejì-arakeji, Osun State
 Kano University of Science and Technology, Kano State
 Ladoke Akintola University of Technology, Ogbomosho, Oyo State
 Nnamdi Azikiwe University, Awka, Anambra State
 Obafemi Awolowo University, Ile-Ife Osun State
 Olabisi Onabanjo University, Ago-iwoye, Ogun State
 Oluwatomisin Olamide Adeshiyan University, Lekki, Lagos State
 River State University of Science and Technology, Npkolu, River State
 University of Benin, Benin, Edo State
 University of Jos, Jos, Plateau State
 University of Lagos, Akoka, Lagos State
 University of Nigeria, Nsukka, Enugu State
 University of Uyo, Uyo, Akwa Ibom State

Polytechnics
 Abia State Polytechnic, Aba, Abia State
 Crown Polytechnic, Odo, Ekiti State
 Federal Polytechnic Ado-Ekiti, Ekiti State
 Federal Polytechnic Bida, Niger State
 Federal Polytechnic Ilaro, Ogun State
 Federal Polytechnic Nekede, Owerri, Imo State
 Federal Polytechnic Oko, Anambra State
 Kogi State Polytechnic, Kogi State
 Kwara State polytechnic, Ilorin, Kwara State
 Osun State Polytechnic, Iree, Osun State
 Lagos State Polytechnic, Ikorodu, Lagos State
 Moshood Abiola Polytechnic, Abeokuta, Ogun State
 The Oke-Ogun Polytechnic, Saki, Oyo State
 The Polytechnic, Ibadan, Oyo State
 Yaba College of Technology, Lagos State, Nigeria

Institute
 Ogun State Institute of Technology (formerly, Gateway Polytechnic) Igbesa, Ogun State

South Africa

Sudan
 Faculty of Architecture, College of Engineering, University of Khartoum, Khartoum
 Faculty of Architecture, Autocratic University, Khartoum
 Faculty of Architecture, National Ribat University, Khartoum
 College of Engineering Sciences, Department of Architecture and Planning, Omdurman Islamic University
 Faculty of Architecture, Future University Khartoum, Khartoum
 Department of Architecture, University of Science and Technology, Khartoum
 Faculty of Architecture, National University, Khartoum
 Faculty of Architecture, University of Medical Sciences and Technology, Khartoum
 Faculty of Architecture, AlMughtaribeen University, Khartoum
 Faculty of Architecture, Department of Architecture and Engineering, The University of Bahri, Khartoum
 Faculty of Architecture, Department of Engineering, Sudan International University, Khartoum
 Faculty of Architecture, University of Garden City, Khartoum
 Faculty of Architecture, Sharg El Neil College, Khartoum

Tanzania
Ardhi University
University of Dar es Salaam
Mbeya University Of Science and Technology

Togo
 Ecole Africaine des Métiers d'Architecture et d'Urbanisme (EAMAU) à Lomé

Tunisia|Tunisie
 , Department of Architecture

Uganda
 College of Engineering, Design, Art and Technology, Makerere University, Kampala
 Faculty of the Built Environment, Uganda Martyrs University, Nkozi
Faculty of lands and architecture, Kyambogo University

Zimbabwe
 Faculty of the Built Environment, National University of Science and Technology, Bulawayo

Asia

Bangladesh

 Bangabandhu Sheikh Mujibur Rahman Science and Technology University Department of Architecture, Gopalganj
 Bangladesh University of Engineering & Technology, Department of Architecture, Faculty of Architecture and Planning, Dhaka
 Chittagong University of Engineering and Technology, Department of Architecture, Faculty of Architecture & Planning, Chittagong
 Dhaka University of Engineering & Technology, Gazipur Department of Architecture, Dhaka
 Hajee Mohammad Danesh Science & Technology University Department of Architecture, Dinajpur
 Khulna University of Engineering & Technology, Department of Architecture , Faculty of Architecture & Planning Khulna
 Khulna University, Discipline of Architecture, School of Science, Engineering & Technology, Khulna
 Military Institute of Science and Technology, Department of Architecture, Dhaka
 Pabna University of Science & Technology, Department of Architecture, Pabna
 Rajshahi University of Engineering and Technology, Department of Architecture, Rajshahi
 Shahjalal University of Science and Technology, Department of Architecture, School of Applied Sciences & Technology, Sylhet
 Ahsanullah University of Science and Technology, Department of Architecture, Dhaka
 American International University Bangladesh, Department of Architecture, Dhaka
 Bangladesh University, Department of Architecture, Dhaka
 Brac University, Department of Architecture, Dhaka
 Daffodil International University, Department of Architecture, Dhaka
 Leading University, Department of Architecture, Sylhet
 North South University, Department of Architecture, Dhaka
 Premier University, Chittagong, Department of Architecture, Chittagong
 Primeasia University, Department of Architecture, Dhaka
 Shanto-Mariam University of Creative Technology, Department of Architecture, Dhaka
 Sonargaon University, Department of Architecture, Dhaka
 Southeast University, Department of Architecture, Dhaka
 Stamford University, Department of Architecture, Dhaka
 State University of Bangladesh, Department of Architecture, Dhaka
 University of Asia Pacific, Department of Architecture, Dhaka

China

 Chongqing University, Architecture and Construction College, Shapingba, Chongqing
 Fuzhou University, College of Architecture, Fuzhou
 Harbin Institute of Technology (HIT) School of Architecture, Harbin, Heilongjiang
 Huazhong University of Science and Technology, College of Architecture and Urban Planning, Wuhan
 South China University of Technology (SCUT), School of Architecture and Civil Engineering, Guangzhou
 Southeast University (SEU), School of Architecture, Nanjing, Jiangsu Province
 Suzhou University of Science and Technology, School of Architecture and Urban Planning, Suzhou, Jiangsu
 Tianjin University (TJU), School of Architecture, Tianjin
 Tongji University, College of Architecture and Urban Planning, Shanghai
 Tsinghua University (THU), School of Architecture, Department of Architecture, Beijing
 Xi'an Jiaotong Liverpool University (XJTLU), Department of Architecture (XLarch), Suzhou, Jiangsu
 Xi'an Jiaotong University, Department of Architecture, Xi'an
 Xi'an University of Architecture and Technology, School of Architecture, Xi'an
 Zhejiang University, College of Civil Engineering and Architecture, Hangzhou, Zhejiang Province
 Zhengzhou University, School of Architecture, Zhengzhou
 Zhejiang University of Science and Technology, School of Civil Engineering and Architecture, Hangzhou
 Inner Mongolia University Of Technology, School of Architecture, Hohhot

Hong Kong
These are the only three universities offering accredited Master of Architecture for architect professional registration.
 The Chinese University of Hong Kong, School of Architecture, Hong Kong, founded in 1992
 The University of Hong Kong, Faculty of Architecture, Department of Architecture, Hong Kong, founded in 1950
 Chu Hai College of Higher Education, Faculty of Science and Engineering, Department of Architecture, Hong Kong, founded in 1949

India
 School of Planning and Architecture, Delhi
 National Institute of Technology, Jaipur, Rajasthan
 National Institute of Technology Trichy, Tamil Nadu
 Chandigarh College of Architecture, Chandigarh
 Bharati Vidyapeeth, Pune
Department of architecture, Central university of Rajasthan, Ajmer
 Department of Planning & Architecture, Malaviya National Institute of Technology, Jaipur
 Department of Architecture, College of Engineering, Trivandrum, Kerala
 Department of Architecture, Maulana Azad National Institute of Technology, Bhopal
 Faculty of Architecture, PES University, Bangalore
 Noble Architecture College, Junagadh (Gujarat)
 Ernad Knowledge City College of Architecture, Malappuram (Kerala)
 East West School of Architecture, Bangalore
 Aayojan School of Architecture, Jaipur
 Academy of Architecture, Mumbai
 Academy of Architecture, Rachana Sansad, Mumbai
 Aditya College of Architecture, Mumbai
 Allana College of Architecture, Pune
 Amity School of Architecture and Planning, Lucknow
 Asian school of architecture and design innovations, Kochi
 Axis institute of architecture, kanpur
 Anna University School of Architecture and Planning, Chennai
 APEEJAY School of Architecture and Planning, Greater Noida
 B. V. Bhoomaraddi College of Engineering and Technology, Hubli, Karnataka, Dept of Architecture
 Balwant Sheth School of Architecture, NMIMS University, Mumbai
 BGS School of Architecture and Planning, Bangalore
 Bharath Architecture Department, Selaiyur, Chennai
 BKPS College of Architecture, BKPS, Pune, Maharashtra
 C.A.R.E. School of Architecture, Tiruchirapalli
 College of Architecture, Trivandrum (CAT)
 College of Engineering & Technology, Bhubaneswar, Orissa
 CSIIT School of Planning and Architecture, Secunderabad
 Cumins College, Pune
 D.C. Patel School of Architecture, Arvindbhai Patel Institute of Environmental Design, Sardar Patel University, Anand
 Dark School of Architecture
 Dayanand Sagar Institutes, School of Architecture, Bangalore (Chiranjith)
 Dehradun Institute of Technology, Dehradun, Uttrakhand
 Department of Architecture, Bengal Engineering and Science University, Shibpur, West Bengal
 Department of Architecture, Birla Institute of Technology, Mesra, Ranchi, Jharkhand
 Department of Architecture, BMSCE, Bangalore
 Department of Architecture, College of Engineering, Trivandrum, Kerala
 Department of Architecture, DBSCR University of Science and Technology, Murthal, Sonepat
 Department of Architecture, Jadavpur University, Kolkata
 Department of Architecture, Madhav Institute of Technology and Science, Gwalior, India
 Department of Architecture, Maharaja Sayajirao University, Baroda, Gujarat
 Department of Architecture, Veer Surendra Sai University of Technology, Burla
 Department of Architecture, National Institute of Technology, Hamirpur, Himachal Pradesh
 Department of Architecture, National Institute of Technology, Patna, Bihar
 Department of Architecture, National Institute of Technology Trichy
 Department of Architecture, School of Planning and Architecture, Bhopal
 Department of Architecture, TKM College of Engineering, Kollam, Kerala
 Department of Architecture, ZHCET, Aligarh Muslim University, Aligarh
 Dignity College of Architecture, Durg
 Dr. Bhanubhen Nanavati College of Architecture for Women (Pune)
 Dr. D.Y. Patil College of Architecture, Nerul, Navi Mumbai
 Faculty of Architecture and Ekistics, Jamia Millia Islamia, New Delhi
 Faculty of Architecture, CEPT University, Ahmedabad
 Faculty of Architecture, Gautam Buddha Technical University, Lucknow
 Faculty of Design, School of Interior Design, CEPT University, Ahmedabad
 Sir J.J. College of Architecture, University of Mumbai, Mumbai
 Hindustan University, Chennai, Tamil Nadu
 Holy Crescent College of Architecture Alwaye, Kerala
 Indian Institute of Technology Kharagpur, West Bengal
 Indian Institute of Technology Roorkee, Uttarakhand
 Integral Institute of Architecture
 Indubhai Parekh School of Architecture, Rajkot, Gujarat
 IES College of Architecture, Mumbai.
 Jawaharlal Nehru Architecture and Fine Arts University, Hyderabad
 Kalasalingam School of Architecture, Kalasalingam University, Krishnankoil, Virudhunagar District/Tamil Nadu/India
 K S School of Architecture, Bangalore
 K.R. Mangalam School of Architecture & Planning, New Delhi
 Kamla Raheja Vidyanidhi Institute for Architecture and Environmental Studies, Mumbai
 Lokmanya Institute of Architecture and Design Studies, Mumbai
 Lovely School of Architecture and Design (LSAD), Lovely Professional University, Punjab
 L.S.Raheja School of Architecture, Mumbai
 M.E.S School of Architecture, MES College of Engineering, Kuttipuram, Kerala
 M.S. Ramaiah School of Architecture, Bangalore
 Manipal University, Manipal
marg institute of design and architecture swarnabhoomi

 Marian College of Architecture and Planning, Kazhakkuttom, Trivandrum
 Masterji College of Architecture, Vattinagulapally, Hyderabad
 Measi Academy of Architecture, Chennai
 MBS School of Planning and Architecture, Dwarka sector 9, New Delhi
 McGan's Ooty School of Architecture, Ooty, Tamil Nadu
 MEASI Academy of Architecture, Chennai, Tamil Nadu
 National Institute of Technology Calicut
 National Institute of Technology Raipur, Chhattisgarh
 National Institute of Technology, Jaipur, Rajasthan
 Om Institute of Architecture and Design, Hisar, Haryana
Papni School of Architecture, Sriperumbudur Taluk, Kanchipuram District, Tamil Nadu.
 Pillai's College of Architecture, New Panvel, Navi Mumbai
 Piloo Modi College of Architecture, ABIT, Cuttack, Orissa
 Prahar School of Architecture (PSA), Coimbatore, Tamil Nadu
 Purvanchal Institute of Architecture & Design, Gorakhpur, U.P.
 R.V. College of Architecture, Bengaluru
 Rajalakshmi School of Architecture Rajalakshmi Engineering College, Thandalam, Chennai, Tamil Nadu.
 Rizvi College of Architecture, Mumbai
 Raffles Design International, Mumbai
 Sardar Vallabhbhai Patel Institute of Technology, SVIT Vasad
 Sasi Creative School of Architecture, Coimbatore
 Sathyabama University, Chennai
 School of Architecture, Dr. M.G.R Educational and Research Institute University, Chennai
 School of Architecture, Government College of Engineering, Trichur, Kerala
 School of Architecture, Meenakshi College of Engineering (SOA, MCE), Chennai
 School of Architecture, Vadodara Design Academy, Vadodara
 School of Architecture & Design, Faculty of Design, Manipal University Jaipur, Jaipur
 School of Architecture and Landscape Design, Shri Mata Vaishno Devi University, Jammu and Kashmir
 School of Planning and Architecture, Bhopal
 School of Architecture and Planning, Periyar Maniammai University, Thanjavur, Tamil Nadu
 School of Planning and Architecture, Vijayawada
 SCMS School of Architecture (SSA), Cochin, Kerala
 Sinhgad College of Architecture (SCOA), Pune
 Smt. Premalatai Chavan College of Architecture, Karad, Maharashtra 
 Sri Venkateshwara College of Architecture, Hyderabad
 SRM School of Architecture, Chennai
 Sunder Deep College of Architecture, Ghaziabad
 Surya School of Architecture (SSA), Chandigarh
 Sushant School of Art and Architecture, Gurgaon
 TVB School of Habitat Studies, Vasant Kunj, New Delhi
 University Institute of Architecture (UIA) Chandigarh University, Mohali
 University School of Architecture and Planning (USAP) GGSIPU, Delhi
 University School of Architecture and Planning (USAP) GGSIPU, Delhi
 The University School of Design, Manasagangothri, Mysore
 Vastu Kala Academy College of Architecture, New Delhi
 Vidya Pratishthan's School of Architecture (VPSOA), Baramati, Pune
 Visvesvaraya National Institute of Technology, Nagpur, Maharashtra
 Viva School of Architecture, Virar (East), Thane, Maharashtra
School of Architecture ( VSPARC), VIT University, Vellore.vit.ac.in

Indonesia

 Atma Jaya University, Yogyakarta
 Bandung Institute of Technology, Bandung
 Binus University, Jakarta
 Brawijaya University, Malang
 Diponegoro University, Semarang
 Gadjah Mada University, Yogyakarta
 Hasanuddin University, Makasar
 Indonesia University of Education, Bandung
 Lambung Mangkurat University, Banjarmasin
 Palangkaraya University, Palangka Raya
  Pancasila University, Jakarta
 Parahyangan Catholic University, Bandung
 Sam Ratulangi University, Menado
 Sebelas Maret University, Surakarta
 Sepuluh November Institute of Technology, Surabaya
 Soegijapranata Catholic University, Semarang
 Tadulako University, Palu
 Tanjung Pura University, Pontianak
 Tanri Abeng University, Jakarta
 Tarumanagara University, Jakarta
 Trisakti University, Jakarta
 Universitas Islam Indonesia, Yogyakarta
 University of Indonesia, Jakarta
 University of North Sumatra, Sumatra Utara
 Udayana University, Denpasar, Bali
 Universitas Islam Negeri Maulana Malik Ibrahim, Malang, Jawa Timur
 Mercu Buana University, Meruya, Jakarta

Iran
Tarbiat Modares University, Tehran
 Art, Architecture University, Department of Architecture
 Azad Bam University
 Azad Kerman University
 Azad Mashad University, Art & Architecture University, Department of Architecture, Mashad
 Azad Shiraz University
 Azad Tehran University, Art & Architecture University, Department of Architecture, Tehran
 Azad University, South Tehran Branch
 Eshragh University, Faculty of Architecture, Department of Architecture, Bojnourd
 Hafez Higher Education Institute of Shiraz
 Imam Khomeini International University, Architecture, Urbanism, Qazvin
 Iran University of Science and Technology (IUST), Faculty of Architecture, Department of Architecture and Urban Planning, Tehran
 Islamic Azad University (Anar branch) Department of Architecture
 Islamic Azad University, Mashhad
 Islamic Azad University of Khorasgan (Isfahan)
 Islamic Azad University of Noor
 Islamic Azad University of Qazvin (QIAU)
 Islamic Azad University of Bandar Anzali (IAU Anzali)
 Islamic Azad University of Shahrood
 Islamic Azad University of Zanjan (AZU)
 Islamic Azad University, South Tehran Branch
 Persian Gulf University of Bushehr
 Shahid Bahonar Technical College of Shiraz
Shahrood University of Technology, Faculty of Architectural Engineering and Urbanism 
 Shiraz university, Faculty of Art and Architecture, Shiraz
 Shahid Chamran University of Ahvaz
 Shahid Rajaee University
 Tabriz Islamic Art University (TIAU), Faculty of Art & Architecture, Tabriz
 Tarbiat Modares University, Faculty of Art and Architecture, Department of Architecture, Tehran
 Technical and Vocational University
 University of Art, Faculty of Urbanism and Architecture, Department of Architecture
 University of Guilan, Architecture, Urbanism, Urban Design and Planning
 University of Isfahan (Isfahan Art), Architecture, Urbanism, Urban Design and Planning
 University of Mazandaran, Faculty of Art and Architecture, Department of Architecture, Babolsar, 
 University of Science and Culture (USC), Faculty of Art and Architecture
 University of Tehran, Faculty of Fine Arts, Department of Architecture, Tehran
 University of Urmia, Faculty of Art and Architecture, Department of Architecture
 Yazd University, Faculty of Art and Architecture, Yazd

Iraq
 Bayan University, Department of Architecture Engineering, Erbil, Kurdistan
 Cihan University, Department of Architecture Engineering, Erbil, Kurdistan
 Ishik University, Architecture Department, Erbil, Kurdistan
 Koya University, Department of Architectural Engineering, Koy Sanjaq, Kurdistan
 Nahrain University, Department of Architectural Engineering, Baghdad
 Nawroz University, Department of Architecture, Duhok, Kurdistan
 Salahaddin University, Architectural Engineering Department, Erbil, Kurdistan
 University of Babylon, College of Engineering, Babylon
 University of Baghdad, Architecture Engineering Department, Baghdad
 University of Basrah, Architectural Department, Basra
 University of Duhok, School of Engineering, Department of Architecture. Duhok, Kurdistan
 University of Mosul, Department of Architectural Engineering, Mosul
 University of Sulaymaniyah, Architectural Engineering, Sulaymaniyah, Kurdistan
 University of Technology, Department of Architectural Engineering, Baghdad
 University of Wasit, Architecture Engineering Department, Kut
 Uruk University College, Architectur Department, Baghdad

Israel
 Ariel University, School of Architecture, Ariel
 Bezalel Academy of Art and Design, Department of Architecture, Jerusalem
 Technion, Israel Institute of Technology, Faculty of Architecture and Town Planning, Haifa
 Tel Aviv University, Yolanda and David Katz Faculty of the Arts, David Azrieli School of Architecture, Tel Aviv
 Wizo School of design, The Neri Bloomfield School of Design and Education, Haifa

Japan
Universities and junior colleges in Japan with a Department of Architecture.

National universities
 Chiba University Faculty of Urban Environmental Systems, Department of Environmental Planning, Department of Architecture
 Hiroshima University Faculty of Architecture (Program of the four species)
 Hokkaido University Faculty of Engineering, Department of Environmental and Social System Architecture
 Kagoshima University Faculty of Engineering, Department of Architecture
 Kobe University Faculty of Engineering, Department of Architecture
 Kumamoto University Faculty of Engineering, Department of Architecture
 Kyoto Institute of Technology, Science part craft engineering modeling region, Kyoto
 Kyoto University,  Faculty of Engineering, Department of Architecture and Architectural Systems, Kyoto
 Kyushu Institute of Technology Faculty of Engineering, Department of Social architecture construction course
 Kyushu University Faculty of Engineering, Department of Architecture / Faculty of Arts (formerly Kyushu Institute of Design), Department of Environmental Design
 Mie University Faculty of Engineering, Department of Architecture
 Muroran Institute of Technology  Faculty of Engineering, Department of Systems Engineering construction, Division of Architecture
 Nagasaki University Faculty of Engineering Department of the structure
 Nagoya Institute of Technology Faculty of Engineering, Architecture & Design Department
 Nagoya University Faculty of Engineering, Department of Social and Environmental Studies Course Architecture
 Nara Women's University Faculty of Environmental Studies life living environment, Department of Housing course
 National University Corporation Tsukuba University of Technology Department of Architecture hearing section
 Niigata University Faculty of Engineering Department of Construction of Architecture
 Oita University Faculty of Engineering, Department of Environmental Engineering course architecture welfare
 Osaka University Faculty of Engineering, Architectural Engineering and Environmental Engineering, Department of General In addition to Earth
 Saga University Faculty of Science and Technology of Urban Engineering, Graduate School of Architecture and Urban Design Course
 Shimane University Faculty of General Science and Technology Department of Materials and Process
 Shinshu University Faculty of Engineering, Department of Architecture
 Tohoku University Faculty of Engineering, Department of Architecture Sendai
 Tokyo Institute of Technology (TokyoTech), Faculty of Engineering, Department of Architecture Tokyo
 Tokyo National University of Fine Arts Faculty of Fine Arts Department of Architecture
 Toyohashi University of Technology Faculty of Engineering Department of Construction
 University of Fukui, Faculty of Engineering, Department of Building & Construction
 University of the Ryukyus Faculty of Engineering, Department of Architecture course construction environment
 University of Tsukuba Science and Technology group (or social engineering <Urban Planning> College of Engineering Systems <Engineering Environment and Development>), main major design group specializing in art school <architectural design, environmental design>
 University of Tokyo, Faculty of Engineering, Department of Architecture, Department of Urban Engineering Tokyo
 University of Toyama Faculty of Arts and Culture, Department of Arts and Design building science course
 Utsunomiya University Faculty of Engineering Department of Construction of Architecture course
 Wakayama University Faculty of Systems Engineering, Department of Environmental Systems
 Yamaguchi University Faculty of Engineering, Department of Kansei Engineering Design Course of the human space
 Yokohama National University Faculty of Engineering, Department of Construction of Architecture

Public universities
 Akita Municipal Junior College of Arts and Crafts Department of Industrial Design
 Akita Prefectural University Faculty of Systems Science and Technology Department of Architecture and Environment Systems
 Gifu City Women's College Interior Design Course, Department of Kansei architecture design vocational life design
 Iwate Prefectural University College of Life Science, Department of Life Science
 Kanazawa College of Art Faculty of Arts and Crafts Design Department of Environmental Design course
 Kyoto Prefectural University Faculty of Life and Environmental Department of Environmental Design, Landscape Design, Architecture, Living Environment course and life course
 Maebashi Institute of Technology Faculty of Engineering, Department of Architecture (Day), Department of Integrated Design (Night)
 Miyagi University Faculty of Project, Department of Design and Information Design, Course of Space Design
 Nagoya City University Faculty of Arts and city Department of Environmental Design
 Okayama Prefectural University School of Design Department of Design
 Osaka City University Faculty of Engineering, Department of Architecture, Environmental Urban Engineering, Graduate School, Life Sciences Division, Department of the living environment
 Prefectural University of Kumamoto, Faculty of Symbiotic Science Course, Department of Environmental Symbiosis residential environment
 Sapporo City University Faculty of Design Department of Design, Space Design Course
 Tokyo Metropolitan University Faculty of Urban Environment, Department of Architecture and Urban urban environment course
 University of Hyogo (Hyogo Prefectural University) Faculty of Human Environment Department of the human environment (course plan living space and conservation course creative living environment course environmental analysis)
 University of Kitakyushu Faculty of International Environmental Engineering, Department of Environmental Space Design KitaKyushu
 The University of Shiga Prefecture Environmental Sciences Department of Environmental Design, Department of

Private universities

Hokkaido and Tohoku
 Dohto University Faculty of Fine Arts Department of Architecture
 Hachinohe Institute of Technology Faculty of Engineering, Department of Architectural Engineering, Faculty of Design, Department of ansei Design, Course of Housing design sensibility
 Hokkai Gakuen University Faculty of Engineering, Department of Architecture
 Hokkaido Institute of Technology Faculty of creation space architecture department (from 2008)
 Koriyama Women's University Faculty of Human Sciences and Design, Department of Human Life
 Tohoku Bunka Gakuen University Faculty of Science and Technology (living from Department of Environmental Planning Department of Environmental Design, human, 2008 Department of Environmental Design )
 Tohoku Institute of Technology Faculty of Engineering, Department of Architecture
 Tohoku University of Art and Design Faculty of Engineering and Design, Department of Environmental Design
 Tokai University (Asahikawa Campus, formerly Hokkaido Tokai University), Faculty of Engineering, Department of Architecture and Environment Design, Arts course architecture Town Planning course, Sapporo

Kanto
 Ashikaga Institute of Technology Faculty of Engineering, Department of Architecture
 Bunka Women's University Faculty of Art, Department of Housing Architectural Design Course
 Chiba Institute of Technology Faculty of Engineering, Department of Architecture and Urban Environment
 Hosei University Faculty of Engineering, Department of Architecture
 Institute of Technologists (Monotsukuri University) Faculty of craft skill, Department of Construction course cities and architecture course architecture and interior design course wooden building finishing course
 Japan Women's University Faculty of Human Sciences and Design dwelling Department of Architecture and Environment Design Course
 Jissen Women's University Faculty of living environment architecture design course
 Kanagawa University Faculty of Engineering, Department of Architecture
 Kanto Gakuin University Faculty of Engineering, Department of Architecture/Faculty of Human Environment Department of Environmental Design
 Keio University Faculty of Science and Technology System Design Engineering (Hiyoshi Campus) and the Faculty of Environmental Information, Department of Information Design (Shonan-Fujisawa Campus)
 Kogakuin University
 Faculty of Architecture, Town Planning Department (established in April 2011), Department of Architecture, Department of Architecture and Design: restructuring and reorganization to "Faculty of Architecture" in April 2011, Faculty of Engineering, Department of Architecture, Part 1, Department of Architecture and Urban Design
 Faculty of Engineering, Department of Architecture Part 2 (night)
 Kokushikan University Faculty of Architecture Department of Design from the Faculty of Science and Technology Department of Science and Engineering, architectural changes to the system
 Komazawa Women's University Faculty of Humanities, Department of molding space
 Kyoei Gakuen Junior College Department of Housing
 Kyoritsu Women's University Faculty of Human Sciences and Design Department of Architecture and Design
 Meiji University Faculty of Science and Technology Department of Architecture
 Meikai University Faculty of Real Estate, Department of Real Estate, Environmental Design Course
 Meisei University Faculty of Science and Technology Department of Architecture
 Musashino Art University Faculty of Art, Department of Architecture
 Musashino University Faculty of Environmental Studies, Department of Environment Living Environment course
 Nihon University
 College of Bioresource Science, Department of Biological and Environmental (Fujisawa Campus, Kanagawa)
 College of Engineering, Department of Architecture (Koriyama Campus, Fukushima)
 College of Fine Arts, Department of Design, Architecture Design Course (Ecoda Campus, Tokyo)
 College of Production Engineering, Department of Architecture (Mimomi Campus, Chiba)
 College of Science and Technology, School of Architecture, School of Marine Engineering Building (Tokyo Surugadai Campus and Chiba Funabashi Campus)
 Junior College Department of Design, Architecture and life (Funabashi Campus, Chiba)
 Nippon Institute of Technology Faculty of Engineering, Department of Architecture
 Shibaura Institute of Technology Faculty of Engineering, Department of Architecture, Department of Architectural Engineering (Mita Campus, Tokyo) Faculty of Systems Engineering, Department of Environmental Systems (Saitama Campus)
 Showa Women's University Faculty of Life Sciences Division, Department of Architecture course living environment, the design area, Department of Interior Architecture and Design, College of cultural creation
 Tama Art University Faculty of Art, Department of Environmental Design Department of Design, Space Design, Faculty of plastic expression field
 Tokai University Faculty of Engineering, Department of Architecture, Faculty of Engineering and Design Department of Architecture and Design
 Tokyo City University (formerly Musashi Institute of Technology), Faculty of Engineering, Department of Architecture
 Tokyo Denki University Faculty of Future Science, Department of Architecture
 Tokyo Polytechnic University Faculty of Engineering, Department of Architecture
 Tokyo University of Science Faculty of Engineering, Department of Architecture, Part 1, Faculty of Engineering, Department of Architecture, Part 2 (Iidabashi Campus, Tokyo), Faculty of Science and Technology Department of Architecture (Noda Campus, Chiba)
 Tokyo Zokei University (Tokyo University of Art and Design) Faculty of Art and Design, Department of Interior Design, interior architecture major area
 Toyo University Faculty of Engineering, Department of Architecture/Faculty of Life human Design, Department of Environmental Design
 Waseda University School of Creative Science and Technology, Department of Architecture

Chubu
 Aichi Institute of Technology Faculty of Engineering Course of the Department of Architecture, Urban and Environmental Studies Course of Architecture and Environment
 Aichi Konan College Department of Life Science, interior and architecture course
 Aichi Sangyo University Art School Department of Architecture, Department of Architecture in Ministry of Education and Communication
 Aichi Shukutoku University Faculty of Contemporary Social Studies, Department of Urban and Environmental Design, Course of modern society
 Chubu University Faculty of Engineering, Department of Architecture
 Daido University Faculty of Engineering, Department of Architecture
 Fukui University of Technology Faculty of Engineering, Department of Building Construction
 Gifu Women's University Faculty of Human Sciences and Design Department of Life Sciences
 Kanazawa Institute of Technology Faculty of Architecture Building and Environment, Department of Architecture and Urban Design
 Meijo University Faculty of Science and Technology, Department of Architecture
 Nagaoka Institute Of Design Faculty of Art, Department of Architecture and Environmental Design
 Nagoya Zokei University (Nagoya University of Art and Design) Art College, Department of Design, Architecture and Design Course space
 Niigata Institute of Technology Faculty of Engineering, Department of Architecture
 Shizuoka University of Art and Culture School of Design, Department of molding space
 Sugiyama Jogakuen University life science unit Department of living and Environmental Design

Kinki
 BAIKA Women's University Faculty of Modern Human Living, Environment Department
 Kansai University Faculty of Urban and Environmental Engineering, Department of Architecture
 Kinki University
 Faculty of Architecture Department of Architecture (established in April 2011: restructuring and reorganization to Faculty of Architecture in April 2011, Faculty of Science and Technology Department of Architecture)
 Faculty of Engineering, Department of Architecture
 Industrial Science and Technology Department of Architecture and Design (Kyushu Campus)
 Literary department seminar and spatial design: Architecture, Department of Art and Design course
 Kio University Faculty of Health Sciences Department of healthy living human environmental design course
 Kobe Design University School of Design, Department of Architecture & Environmental
 Kwansei Gakuin University Faculty of Policy Management, urban policy field
 Kyoto Seika University, Faculty of Design, Department of Architecture, Kyoto
 Kyoto Tachibana University Faculty of Modern Business, Department of Urban Design, Tourism and Urban design course Interior and Architecture course,
 Kyoto University of the Arts Faculty of Arts, Department of Environmental Design, Architecture Design Course/Ministry of Education Department of Design, Architecture Design Course
 Kyoto Women's University Faculty of Human Sciences and Design, Department of formative life
 Mukogawa Women's University Faculty of living environment, Department of Architecture
 Osaka Institute of Technology Faculty of Engineering, Department of Architecture, Department of Space Design
 Osaka Sangyo University Faculty of Engineering, Department of Environmental Design, Architecture, from the Department of Environmental Design (renamed in April 2008) living environment from the Department of Urban and Environmental Department, Faculty of Human Environment (renamed in April 2008)
 Osaka Shoin Women's University College of liberal arts, Department of Interior Design
 Osaka University of Arts Faculty of Arts, Department of Architecture
 Osaka University of Human Sciences Faculty of Human Sciences, Department of Environment and Architectural Design
 Otemae Junior College Department of Housing Comprehensive System Design Life
 Ritsumeikan University Faculty of Science and Technology Urban Systems Engineering, Department of Architecture and Urban Design
 Setsunan University Faculty of Science and Technology, Department of Architecture
 Takarazuka University of Art and Design School of Art, Department of Industrial Design, Architectural Design Course and Interior Design Course
 Tezukayama University Faculty of Modern Life Design, Department of Dwelling Space

Chugoku, Shikoku and Kyushu
 Daiichi Institute of Technology (first technical university) Faculty of Engineering, Department of Architecture
 Fukuoka University Faculty of Engineering, Department of Architecture
 Fukuyama University Faculty of Engineering, Department of Architecture
 Hiroshima Jogakuin University Life Sciences Faculty, Department of Design and living information
 Hiroshima Institute of Technology Faculty of Engineering, Department of Architecture, Faculty of Environmental Studies Department of Environmental Design
 Hiroshima International University Faculty of Design, Department of Housing (Social and Environmental Sciences)
 Kawasaki University of Medical Welfare Faculty of Management, Department of Design, Health and Welfare
 Kochi University of Technology Faculty of Social Systems Engineering
 Kurume Institute of Technology Faculty of Engineering, Department of Building Facilities
 Kwassui Women's College Faculty of Life Healthy Life, Department of Design
 Kyushu Kyoritsu University Faculty of Engineering, Department of Architecture
 Kyushu Sangyo University Faculty of Engineering, Department of Architecture, Department of housing and interior design
 Kyushu Women's University Faculty of Human Sciences and Design, Department of Human Life
 Matsuyama Shinonome Junior College Department of Life Sciences School of Life Design
 Mimasaka University of Life Sciences Faculty, Welfare, Department of Environmental Design course architecture welfare
 Nagasaki Institute of Applied Science Faculty of Engineering, Department of Architecture
 Nippon Bunri University Faculty of Engineering, Department of Architecture and Design
 Nishinippon Institute of Technology School of Design, Department of Architecture
 Okayama University of Science Faculty of Information Technology, Department of Architecture
 Sojo University Faculty of Engineering, Department of Architecture
 Tohwa University Faculty of Environmental Design Engineering course architectural, interior design of residential
 Tokai University (Kumamoto Campus, formerly Kyushu Tokai University), School of Industrial Engineering, Department of Architecture
 Tokushima Bunri University Faculty of Human Life, Department of Housing
 Tottori University of Environmental Studies Faculty of Environmental Information, Department of Environmental Design
 Yasuda Women's University Faculty of Human Sciences and Design, Department of life Design

Jordan
 Jordan University of Science and Technology, College of Architecture and Design, Ar Ramtha.
University of Jordan, Department of Architecture,all programs of the school of engineering of The University of Jordan are available on this link, Amman.

Laos
 National University of Laos, Faculty of Architecture, Vientiane capital city
 Souphanouvong University, Faculty of Architecture, Luangprabang world heritage city

Lebanon
 American University of Beirut, Faculty of Architecture, Beirut
 Beirut Arab University, Faculty of Architecture, Debbieh
 Lebanese American University, Faculty of Architecture, Beirut
 Académie libanaise des Beaux-Arts, Faculty of Architecture
 Lebanese University, Institute des Beaux Arts, Department of Architecture
 Notre Dame University–Louaize, Faculty of Architecture, Louaize
 Université Saint-Esprit de Kaslik, Department of Architecture, Kaslik
Université Saint-Joseph, Ecole d'Architecture, Beirut

Malaysia
 ALFA International College, School of Architecture, Subang Jaya, Selangor
 Infrastructure University Kuala Lumpur (IUKL), School of Architecture and Built Environment, Kajang
 International Islamic University of Malaysia Kulliyyah (Faculty) of Architecture and Environmental Design, Gombak, Selangor
 International University College of Technology Twintech, Faculty of Built Environment (FABE), Department of Architecture, Bandar Sri Damansara, Kuala Lumpur
 Limkokwing University, Faculty of Built Environment (FABE), Department of Architecture, Cyberjaya
 Linton University College, Department of Architecture, Mantin, Negeri Sembilan
 MARA University of Technology (UiTM), Faculty of Architecture, Planning and Surveying, Department of Architecture, Shah Alam, Selangor, Sri Iskandar, Perak
 National University of Malaysia (UKM), Faculty of Engineering & Built Environment, Department of Architecture, Bangi, Selangor
 Port Dickson Polytechnic, Architectural Unit, Department of Civil Engineering, Port Dickson, Negeri Sembilan
 Putra University, Malaysia (UPM), Faculty of Design and Architecture (FRSB), Serdang, Selangor
 Taylor's University, School of Architecture, Building and Design (SABD), Petaling Jaya
 Tunku Abdul Rahman University College (TARUC), Faculty of Engineering and Built Environment (FEBE), Kuala Lumpur
 University College Sedaya International (UCSI) Department of Architecture Cheras, Kuala Lumpur
 University of Malaya (UM), Faculty of the Built Environment (FBE), Kuala Lumpur
 University of Science, Malaysia (USM), School Of Housing, Building And Planning (HBP), Architecture Department. Minden, Penang
 Universiti Teknologi Malaysia (UTM), Faculty of Built Environment (FAB), Department of Architecture, Skudai, Johor Bahru
 Universiti Tunku Abdul Rahman (UTAR), Lee Kong Chian Faculty of Engineering and Science (LKC FES), Department of Architecture & Sustainable Design, Sungai Long, Selangor
 Universiti Sains Islam Malaysia (USIM), Faculty of Engineering and Built Environment (FKAB), Department of Architecture, Nilai, Negeri Sembilan

Oman
 Caledonian College of Engineering
 Higher College of Technology
 Sultan Qaboos University

Pakistan

Khyber Pakhtunkhwa
 CECOS University of Information Technology and Emerging Sciences, Department of Architecture, Peshawar
 University of Engineering and Technology, Peshawar, Department of Architecture, Abbottabad

Punjab
 Beaconhouse National University Department of Architecture, School of Architecture and Design, Lahore
 COMSATS Institute of Information Technology (CIIT), Department of Architecture, Islamabad
 COMSATS Institute of Information Technology (CIIT), Department of Architecture, Lahore
 National College of Arts, Department of Architecture, Lahore
 National College of Arts, Department of Architecture, Rawalpindi
 National University of Sciences and Technology, School of Art, Design and Architecture, Islamabad
 University of Engineering and Technology, Lahore, Department of Architecture
 University of the Punjab, Department of Architecture, College Of Art and Design, Lahore
 University of South Asia, Department of Architecture (Accreditation on hold), Lahore
 University of Lahore, Department of Architecture, Lahore

Sindh
 Dawood University of Engineering and Technology, Department of Architecture, Karachi
 Indus Valley School of Art and Architecture, Department of Architecture, Karachi
 Mehran University of Engineering and Technology, Department of Architecture, Centre of Excellence in Art and Design (Accreditation on hold), Jamshoro
 Mehran University of Engineering and Technology, Department of Architecture, Jamshoro
 NED University of Engineering and Technology, Department of Architecture, Karachi
 University of Karachi, Architecture Program at Department of Visual Studies, Karachi

Philippines

Luzon
Adamson University (AdU), College of Architecture
Don Honorio Ventura Technological State University (DHVTSU), College of Engineering and Architecture, Bacolor, Pampanga
Bulacan State University (BulSU), College of Architecture and Fine Arts, Malolos City
Cebu Institute of Technology – University (CIT-U), College of Engineering and Architecture, Cebu City
Central Colleges of the Philippines (CCP), College of Architecture
De La Salle–College of Saint Benilde (DLS-CSB), College of Architecture
De La Salle University–Dasmariñas (DLSU-D), College of Engineering Architecture and Technology, Dasmariñas
Eulogio "Amang" Rodriguez Institute of Science and Technology (EARIST), College of Architecture and Fine Arts
Far Eastern University (FEU), Institute of Architecture and Fine Arts (IARFA)
FEATI University, College of Architecture
Manuel L. Quezon University (MLQU), School of Architecture
Mapúa Institute of Technology (MIT), School of Architecture, Industrial Design and the Built Environment
National University (NU), College of Architecture
Nueva Ecija University of Science and Technology (NEUST), College of Architecture
Pamantasan ng Lungsod ng Maynila (PLM), College of Architecture and Urban Planning
Polytechnic University of the Philippines, College of Architecture and Fine Arts (PUP-CAFA)
Rizal Technological University (RTU), College of Engineering and Industrial Technology
Saint Louis University (SLU), Otto Hahn School of Engineering and Architecture, Baguio
Technological Institute of the Philippines-Manila (TIP-Manila) and Quezon City (TIP-QC) College of Architecture and Engineering
Technological University of the Philippines-Manila (TUP-Manila) College of Architecture and Fine Arts
University of the Assumption (UA), College of Engineering and Architecture, City of San Fernando, Pampanga
University of Baguio (UB), College of Engineering and Architecture, Baguio
University of the Cordilleras (UC-BCF), College of Engineering and Architecture, Baguio
University of Pangasinan (UPANG), College of Architecture, Dagupan
University of the Philippines Diliman (UP-D), College of Architecture
University of Saint Anthony (USANT), College of Engineering and Architecture and Technology, San Miguel, Iriga City
University of Santo Tomas (UST), College of Architecture

Visayas and Mindanao
La Consolacion College–Bacolod (LCCB), School of Architecture, Fine Arts and Interior Design, Bacolod
Mindanao University of Science and Technology (MUST), College of Engineering and Architecture, Lapasan, Cagayan de Oro
Silliman University (SU), College of Engineering and Design, Department of Architecture, Dumaguete
University of Mindanao (UM), College of Architecture and Fine Arts, Davao City
University of the Philippines Mindanao, UPMin, B.S. Architecture Program, Davao City
University of San Agustin (USA), College of Engineering and Architecture, General Luna, Iloilo City
University of San Carlos (USC), College of Architecture and Fine Arts, Cebu City
Western Mindanao State University, College of Architecture, Zamboanga City
Western Visayas College of Science and Technology, College of Engineering and Architecture, Iloilo City

Saudi Arabia
 King Abdulaziz University, Faculty of Environmental Design, Jeddah
 Effat University, Faculty of Architecture & Design, Jeddah https://www.effatuniversity.edu.sa/English/Academics/Undergraduate/CoAD/Pages/default.aspx
 King Fahd University of Petroleum & Minerals, College of Environmental Design, Dhahran
 King Faisal University, College of Architecture and Planning, Dammam
 King Saud University, College of Architecture and Planning, Riyadh
 Qassim University, College of Architecture and Planning, Buraidah
 Umm al-Qura University, College of Engineering and Islamic Architecture, Makkah
 University of Dammam, College of Architecture and Planning, Dammam
 iLines Architecture, Makkah, Saudi Arabia.

Singapore
 National University of Singapore (NUS), School of Design and Environment (SDE), Department of Architecture
 Singapore University of Technology and Design (SUTD) Department of Architecture and Sustainable Design.

South Korea
 Hanyang University, Department of Architecture, College of Architecture, Seoul
 Hongik University, Department of Architecture, College of Architecture, Seoul
 Konkuk University, Department of Architecture, College of Architecture, Seoul
 Konkuk University, [GSAKU] Graduate School of Architecture, Seoul
 Kookmin University, [SAKU] Department of Architecture, College of Architecture, Seoul
 Korea National University of Arts (K-ARTS), School of Visual Arts, Seoul
 Korea University (KU), Department of Architecture, Seoul
 Kyunghee University (KHU), Department of Architecture, Yongin
 Myongji University (MJU), College of Architecture, Yongin
 Seoul National University (SNU), Department of Architecture, Seoul
 Sungkyunkwan University (SKKU), Department of Architecture, Seoul
 University of Seoul, Department of Architecture, College of Urban Sciences, Seoul
 University of Ulsan (Ulsan Institute of Technology, UIT), School of Architecture, Ulsan
 Wonkwang University (WKU), Department of Architecture, Iksan
 Yonsei University (YU), Department of Architectural Engineering, Seoul

Sri Lanka
 City School of Architecture (CSA), Colombo
 University of Moratuwa (UoM), Faculty of Architecture, Department of Architecture, Moratuwa
 University of Kelaniya (UOK), Faculty of Architecture, Department of Architecture, Kelaniya

Taiwan
 Chinese Culture University, College of Environmental Design, Department of Architecture and Urban Design, Taipei
 Chung Hua University, College of Architecture and Planning, Department of Architecture and Urban Planning, Hsinchu
 Chung Yuan Christian University, College of Design, Department of Architecture, Zhongli
 Feng Chia University, School of Architecture, Taichung City
 Ming Chuan University, School of Design, Department of Architecture, Taipei
 National Cheng Kung University, College of Planning & Design, Department of Architecture, Tainan City
 National Chiao Tung University, College of Humanities and Social Sciences, Graduate Institute of Architecture, Hsinchu
 National Quemoy University, Department of Architecture, Kinmen County
 National Taiwan University of Science and Technology, Department of Architecture, Taipei City
 Tamkang University, College of Engineering, Department of Architecture, Danshui District, New Taipei City
 Tunghai University, Department of Architecture, Taichung City

Thailand
 Assumption University (AU), The International University in Thailand, School of Architecture, Suwannaphumi, Bangkok
 Bangkok University (BU), Faculty of Architecture, Pathum Thani
 Chiang Mai University (CMU), Faculty of Architecture, Chiang Mai
 Chulalongkorn University (CU), Faculty of Architecture, INDA (International Program in Design and Architecture) Bangkok
 Kasem Bundit University (KBU), Faculty of Architecture, Bangkok
 Kasetsart University (KU), Faculty of Architecture, Bang Khen, Bangkok
 Khon Kaen University (KKU), Faculty of Architecture, Khon Kaen
 King Mongkut's Institute of Technology Ladkrabang (KMITL), Faculty of Architecture, Department of Architecture, Lat Krabang, Bangkok
 King Mongkut's University of Technology Thonburi (KMUTT/Bangmod), School of Architecture and Design, Thung Khru, Bangkok
 Maejo University (MJU), Faculty of Architecture and Environmental Design, Sansai, Chiang Mai
 Mahasalakarm University (MSU), Faculty of Architecture Urban Design and Creative Arts, Mahasalakarm
 Rajamangala University of Technology Thanyaburi (RMUTT), Faculty of Architecture, Pathum Thani
 Rangsit University (RSU), Faculty of Architecture, Rangsit
 Silpakorn University (SU), Faculty of Architecture, Bangkok
 Sripatum University (SPU), Faculty of Architecture, Bangkok
 Thammasat University (TU), Faculty of Architecture and Planning, Pathum Thani

United Arab Emirates
 Abu Dhabi University, Department of Architecture and Design, College of Engineering and Computer Science, Abu Dhabi
 American University in Dubai, Department of Architecture
 Ajman University of Science and Technology, College of Architectural Engineering, Ajman
 American University of Sharjah, College of Architecture, art and Design, Sharjah
 Canadian University of Dubai, College of Architecture, Dubai
 United Arab Emirates University, Department of Architectural Engineering, Al Ain
 University of Sharjah, College of Architectural Engineering, Sharjah

Vietnam
 Hanoi Architectural University, Hanoi
 Ho Chi Minh City Architecture University, Ho Chi Minh City
 Hue University of Sciences, Faculty of Architecture, Huế
 National University of Civil Engineering, Faculty of Architecture and Urban Planning, Hanoi
 Van Lang University, Ho Chi Minh city
 Ton Duc Thang University, Faculty of Civil Engineering, Department Of Architecture, Ho Chi Minh City

Europe

Albania
 Albanian University
 Epoka University, Department of Architecture
 International school of Architecture and Urban Policies, POLIS University
 Universiteti Politeknik i Tiranës, Departamenti i Arkitekturës dhe Urbanistikës

Austria
 Academy of Fine Arts Vienna, Architektur, Vienna
 University for Continuing Education Krems, Department for Building and Environment, Krems an der Donau
 Graz University of Technology (TU Graz), Faculty of Architecture, Graz
 University of Applied Arts Vienna, School of Architecture, Vienna
 University of Art and Design Linz, Department the architecture programme, Linz
 University of Innsbruck, Fakultät für Architektur, Innsbruck
 TU Wien, Fakultät für Architektur und Raumplanung, Vienna

Belgium

French Community of Belgium
The following is a list of French-speaking architectural schools in Belgium:

Architecture
 University of Louvain (UCLouvain)
 Faculty of Architecture, Architectural Engineering and Urban Planning, Brussels, Tournai and Louvain-la-Neuve
 School of Urbanism and Territorial Planning, Louvain School of Engineering, Louvain-la-Neuve
 University of Liège (ULiège)
 Faculty of Architecture, Liège
 Gembloux Agro-Bio Tech, Gembloux
 Université libre de Bruxelles (ULB), Faculty of Architecture, Ixelles
 University of Mons (UMons), Faculty of Architecture and Urban Planning, Mons
 Institut Saint-Luc, Higher Institute for Urbanism and Urban Renovation (ISURU), Brussels

Architectural engineering
 University of Louvain (UCLouvain)
 Faculty of Architecture, Architectural Engineering and Urban Planning, Brussels, Tournai and Louvain-la-Neuve
 Louvain School of Engineering, Louvain-la-Neuve
 University of Liège (ULiège), School of Engineering, Liège
 Université libre de Bruxelles (ULB), École polytechnique de Bruxelles, Brussels
 University of Mons (UMons), Faculty of Engineering, Mons

Interior architecture

 Saint-Luc Institutes Brussels, Saint-Luc Brussels School of Arts (ESA), Brussels
 Saint-Luc Liège School of Arts, Liège
 City of Liège School of Arts, Liège
 Arts2 School of Arts, Mons
 ENSAV La Cambre, Brussels
 Académie Royale des Beaux-Arts de la Ville de Bruxelles (ARBA-ESA), Brussels
 Académie Royale des Beaux-Arts de la Ville de Tournai, Tournai

Flemish Community|Flemish Community of Belgium
The following is a list of Dutch-speaking architectural schools in Belgium:

Architecture
University of Antwerp (UA), Faculty of Design Sciences, Antwerp
Katholieke Universiteit te Leuven (KU Leuven), Faculty of Architecture, Schaerbeek and Ghent
Hasselt University (UHasselt), Faculty of Architecture and Arts, Hasselt

Architectural engineering
Ghent University (UGent), Faculty of Engineering and Architecture, Ghent
Katholieke Universiteit te Leuven (KU Leuven), Faculty of Engineering Sciences, Leuven
Vrije Universiteit Brussel (VUB), Faculty of Engineering, Ixelles

Bosnia and Herzegovina
 International University of Sarajevo, Faculty of Architecture and Social Science, Sarajevo
 University of Banja Luka, Faculty of Architecture and Civil Engineering, Banja Luka
 University of Sarajevo, Faculty of Architecture, Sarajevo

Bulgaria
 Higher School of Civil Engineering (VSU) "Lyben Karavelov", Sofia
 New Bulgarian University, Sofia
 University of Architecture, Civil Engineering and Geodesy, Sofia
 Varna Free University "Chernorizets Hrabar", Varna

Croatia
 University of Split, Faculty of Civil Engineering, Architecture and Geodesy, Split
 University of Zagreb, Faculty of Architecture, Zagreb

Cyprus
 Cyprus School of Architecture, Cyprus College of Art, Lemba.
 Eastern Mediterranean University, Faculty of Architecture, Famagusta
 Frederick University, School of Architecture, Fine and Applied Arts, Department of Architecture, Nicosia
 Neapolis University, School of Architecture and Environmental Sciences, Paphos
 University of Cyprus, School of Engineering, Department of Architecture, Nicosia
 University of Nicosia, School of Humanities, Social Science & Law, Department of Architecture, Nicosia

Czech Republic
 Academy of Arts, Architecture and Design, Department of architecture, Prague
 ARCHIP, Architectural Institute in Prague, Prague
 Brno University of Technology, Faculty of Architecture, Brno
 Czech Technical University in Prague, Faculty of Architecture, Prague
 Technical University of Liberec, Faculty of Architecture, Liberec

Denmark
 Aarhus School of Architecture, Aarhus
 Royal Danish Academy of Fine Arts

Estonia
 Estonian Academy of Arts, Tallinn

Finland
 Aalto University
 Tampere University of Technology
 University of Oulu, Department of Architecture, Oulu

France
Architecture schools in France are called ENSA: École nationale supérieure d'architecture.
 École d'architecture de la ville et des territoires à Marne-la-Vallée, Champs-sur-Marne
 École de Chaillot, La cité de l'architecture et du patrimoine, Palais de Chaillot, Paris
 École nationale supérieure d'architecture de Clermont-Ferrand, Clermont-Ferrand
 École nationale supérieure d'architecture de Grenoble, Grenoble
 École nationale supérieure d'architecture de Lyon, Lyon
 École nationale supérieure d'architecture de Marseille-Luminy, Marseille
 École nationale supérieure d'architecture de Montpellier, Montpellier
 École nationale supérieure d'architecture de Nancy, Nancy
 École nationale supérieure d'architecture de Nantes, Nantes
 École nationale supérieure d'architecture de Normandie, Rouen
 École nationale supérieure d'architecture de Paris-Belleville, Paris
 École nationale supérieure d'architecture de Paris-La Villette (ENSAPLV), Paris
 École nationale supérieure d'architecture de Paris-Malaquais, Paris
 École nationale supérieure d'architecture de Paris-Val de Seine, Paris
 École nationale supérieure d'architecture de Rennes Rennes, Brittany
 École nationale supérieure d'architecture de Saint-Étienne, Saint-Étienne
 École nationale supérieure d'architecture de Strasbourg, Strasbourg
 École nationale supérieure d'architecture de Toulouse, Toulouse
 École nationale supérieure d'architecture de Versailles, Versailles
 École nationale supérieure d'architecture et de paysage de Bordeaux, Bordeaux
 École nationale supérieure d'architecture et de paysage de Lille, Lille
 École nationale supérieure des arts et industries de Strasbourg, INSA de Strasbourg, Strasbourg
 École spéciale d'architecture (ESA), Paris
 Institut national des sciences appliquées de Strasbourg, Strasbourg
 Confluence Institute for Innovation and Creative Strategies in Architecture, Paris
 Paris School of Architecture (PSA), Paris

Germany

Architecture schools in Germany can be part of art academies, technical universities or universities of applied sciences.

Greece
 Aristotle University of Thessaloniki, Faculty of Engineering, School of Architecture, Thessaloniki
 Democritus University of Thrace, Faculty of Engineering, Department of Architectural Engineering, Xanthi
 National Technical University of Athens (Εθνικό Μετσόβιο Πολυτεχνείο), School of Architecture, Athens
 Technical University of Crete, Department of Architecture, Chania
 University of Patras, School of Engineering, Department of Architecture, Patras
 University of Thessaly, School of Engineering, Department of Architecture, Volos
 University of Ioannina, School of Engineering, Department of Architecture, Ioannina

Hungary
 Budapest University of Technology and Economics, Faculty of Architecture, Budapest
 Moholy-Nagy University of Art and Design, Faculty of Architecture, Budapest
 Nyugat-Magyarországi Egyetem, Faipari Mérnöki Kar, Sopron
 Széchenyi István University, Faculty of Architectural Design, Győr
 Szent István University, Ybl Miklós Faculty of Architecture and Civil Engineering, Budapest
 University of Debrecen, Faculty of Technology, Debrecen
 University of Pécs, Pollack Mihály Faculty of Technology, Pécs

Iceland
Iceland Academy of Arts, Department of Design & Architecture, Reykjavík

Ireland

Architecture Schools in the Republic of Ireland

Architecture Schools in Northern Ireland (United Kingdom)
 Queen's University Belfast, School of Natural and Built Environment, Belfast,
 Ulster University, Belfast School of Architecture, Belfast

Italy

Latvia
 Riga Technical University
 Rigas International School of Economics and Business Administration

Lithuania
 Kaunas University of Technology
 Vilnius Academy of Arts
 Vilnius Gediminas Technical University

Moldova
 Technical University of Moldova, Urbanism and Architecture Faculty; http://utm.md/en/

Netherlands

 Amsterdam School of the Arts, Amsterdam Academy of Architecture, Amsterdam
 ArtEZ, Arnhem Academy of Architecture, Arnhem
 Berlage Institute, Postgraduate Laboratory of Architecture, Rotterdam
 Delft University of Technology, Faculty of Architecture, Delft
 Eindhoven University of Technology, Department of Architecture, Building and Planning, Eindhoven
 Maastricht University, Faculty of Humanities & Sciences, Department of Architecture, Maastricht
 The Rotterdam Academy of Architecture and Urban Design, Rotterdam

North Macedonia
 The Ss. Cyril and Methodius University, Faculty of Architecture
 State University of Tetovo, Applied Sciences Faculty
 University American College Skopje, Faculty of Architecture and Design

Norway
Godkjente arkitektskoler:
 Bergen School of Architecture, Bergen
 Norwegian University of Science and Technology Faculty of Architecture and Fine Art, Trondheim
 Oslo School of Architecture and Design, Oslo

Poland
 Andrzej Frycz Modrzewski Krakow University (Krakowska Akademia im. Andrzeja Frycza Modrzewskiego), Faculty of Architecture and Fine Arts, Kraków
 Białystok Technical University (Politechnika Białostocka), Faculty of Architecture, Białystok
 Gdańsk University of Technology (Politechnika Gdańska), Faculty of Architecture, Gdańsk
 Kielce University of Technology (Politechnika Świętokrzyska), Faculty of Architecture and Town Planning, Kielce
 Lublin University of Technology (Politechnika Lubelska), Faculty of Architecture, Lublin
 Poznań University of Technology (Politechnika Poznańska), Faculty of Architecture, Poznań
 Silesian University of Technology (Politechnika Śląska), Faculty of Architecture, Gliwice
 Tadeusz Kościuszko University of Technology (Politechnika Krakowska), Kraków
 Technical University of Łódź, Faculty of Civil Engineering, Architecture and Environmental Engineering, Łódź
 University of Arts in Poznań (Uniwersytet Artystyczny w Poznaniu), Faculty of Architecture and Design, Poznań
 University of Economy Bydgoszcz (Wyższa Szkoła Gospodarki (WSG)), Architecture und Town Planning, Bydgoszcz
 Warsaw University of Technology (Politechnika Warszawska), Faculty of Architecture, Warszawa
 West Pomeranian University of Technology (Zachodniopomorski Uniwersytet Technologiczny), Faculty of Civil Engineering and Architecture, Szczecin
 Wroclaw University of Technology (Politechnika Wrocławska), Faculty of Architecture, Wrocław

Portugal
 Escola de Arquitectura da Universidade do Minho
 Escola Superior Artística do Porto, Arquitectura, Porto
 Escola Superior Gallaecia (ESG), Arquitectura, Vila Nova de Cerveira
 Escola Universitária das Artes de Coimbra
 Instituto Superior de Ciências do Trabalho e da Empresa (ISCTE), Department of Architecture, Lisbon
 Lusíada University of Porto (ULP), Faculty of Architecture and Arts (FAAULP), Porto
 Technical University of Lisbon (UTL), Instituto Superior Técnico (IST), Department of Civil Engineering and Architecture, Lisbon
 Universidade Autónoma de Lisboa Luís de Camões
 Universidade da Beira Interior (UBI), Arquitectura Covilhã
 Universidade Lusíada de Lisboa, School of Architecture and Arts, Lisbon
 Universidade Lusófona de Humanidades e Tecnologias
 University of Coimbra (UC), Faculty of Sciences and Technology (FCTUC), Department of Architecture, Coimbra
 University of Évora (UE), Department of Architecture, Évora
 University of Porto (UP), Faculty of Architecture (FAUP), Porto
 Technical University of Lisbon (UTL), Faculty of Architecture (FA), Lisbon

Romania
 Ion Mincu University of Architecture and Urbanism, Bucharest
 University of Oradea, Facultatea de Architectură şi Construcţii, Oradea
 Polytechnic University of Timișoara, Facultatea de Arhitectură, Timișoara
 Spiru Haret University, Facultatea de Arhitectură, Bucharest
 Universitatea Tehnică Cluj-Napoca, Facultatea de Arhitectură, Cluj-Napoca
 Universitatea Tehnică "Gheorghe Asachi", Facultatea de Arhitectură, Iaşi

Russia
 Institute of Architecture & Art, Rostov-on-Don
 MArchI, Moscow Architectural Institute – State Academy
 Moscow Architecture School MARCH 
 Moscow State University of Civil Engineering – Institute of Construction and Architecture, Moscow
 Novosibirsk State University of Architecture, Design and Arts
 Pacific National University, Faculty of Architecture & Design, Khabarovsk
 Russian Academy of Arts, Department of Architecture
 Saint-Petersburg State University of Architecture and Civil Engineering, Saint-Petersburg
 State University of Land Use Planning, Faculty of Architecture
 Tomsk State University of Architecture and Building, Tomsk
 USAAA, Ural State Academy of Architecture and Arts, Ekaterinburg
 Vologda State Technical University, Department of Architecture and Urban Design, Vologda

Serbia
 State University of Novi Pazar, Faculty of Technical Sciences, Novi Pazar
 University of Belgrade, Faculty of Architecture, Belgrade
 University of Niš, Faculty of Civil Engineering and Architecture, Niš
 University of Novi Sad, Faculty of Technical Sciences, Novi Sad
 University of Prišina, Faculty of Technical Sciences, Kosovska Mitrovica

Slovakia
 Academy of Fine Arts and Design in Bratislava, Department of Architecture, Bratislava
 Slovak University of Technology in Bratislava, Faculty of Architecture, Bratislava
 Technical University of Košice, Faculty of Arts, Košice

Slovenia
 University of Ljubljana, Faculty of Architecture, Ljubljana
 University of Maribor, Faculty of Civil Engineering (Department of Architecture), Maribor

Spain
Architecture schools in Spain are called ETSA: "Escuela Técnica Superior de Arquitectura" in Spanish, or "Escola Tècnica Superior d'Arquitectura" in Catalan.

Andalucía;
 International School of Metaphoric Architecture, Málaga
 Escuela Técnica Superior de Arquitectura de la Universidad de Granada, Granada
 Escuela Técnica Superior de Arquitectura de la Universidad de Málaga, Málaga
 Escuela Técnica Superior de Arquitectura de la Universidad de Sevilla, Sevilla

Castilla-La Mancha;
 Escuela de Arquitectura de la Universidad de Castilla-La Mancha, Toledo

Castilla y León;
 Escuela Técnica Superior de Arquitectura de la Universidad de Valladolid, Valladolid
 Escuela Técnica Superior de Arquitectura de la Universidad IE (Segovia)

Catalunya;
 Barcelona Institute of Architecture (BIArch)
 Escola Tècnica Superior d'Arquitectura de Barcelona de la Universitat Politècnica de Catalunya, Barcelona
 Escola Tècnica Superior d'Arquitectura de la Universitat de Girona, Girona
 Escola Tècnica Superior d'Arquitectura de la Universitat Internacional de Catalunya, Barcelona
 Escola Tècnica Superior d'Arquitectura de la Universitat Ramon Llull – La Salle, Barcelona
 Escola Tècnica Superior d'Arquitectura de la Universitat Rovira i Virgili, Reus
 Escola Tècnica Superior d'Arquitectura del Vallès de la Universitat Politècnica de Catalunya, Sant Cugat del Vallès
 Institute for Advanced Architecture of Catalonia, Barcelona
 Metropolis Master in Architecture and Urban Culture (Universitat Politècnica de Catalunya/Centre de Cultura Contemporània de Barcelona)

Galicia;
 Escola Técnica Superior de Arquitectura da Coruña, A Coruña

Las Palmas de Gran Canaria;
 Escuela Técnica Superior de Arquitectura de la Universidad de Las Palmas de Gran Canaria, Gran Canaria

Madrid;
 Escuela Técnica Superior de Arquitectura de la Universidad Alfonso X, Madrid
 Escuela Técnica Superior de Arquitectura de la Universidad Camilo José Cela, Madrid
 Escuela Técnica Superior de Arquitectura de la Universidad CEU San Pablo, Madrid
 Escuela Técnica Superior de Arquitectura de la Universidad de Alcalá, Madrid
 Escuela Técnica Superior de Arquitectura de la Universidad Europea de Madrid, Madrid
 Escuela Técnica Superior de Arquitectura de la Universidad Francisco de Vitoria, Madrid
 Escuela Técnica Superior de Arquitectura de la Universidad IE, Madrid/Segovia
 Escuela Técnica Superior de Arquitectura de la Universidad Pontificia de Salamanca, Madrid
 Escuela Técnica Superior de Arquitectura de Madrid

Navarra;
 Escuela Técnica Superior de Arquitectura de la Universidad de Navarra, Pamplona

País Vasco;
 Escuela Técnica Superior de Arquitectura de la Universidad del País Vasco, San Sebastián

Valencia;
 Escuela Superior de Enseñanzas Técnicas, Arquitectura, Universidad CEU Cardenal Herrera
 Polytechnic University of Valencia (UPV), School of Architecture (ETSAV), Valencia
 University of Alicante, Department of Architectural Constructions, Alicante

Sweden
 Chalmers University of Technology, Department of Architecture, Gothenburg
 Lund University, Department of Architecture, Lund
 KTH Royal Institute of Technology, School of Architecture and Built Environment, Stockholm
 Umeå School of Architecture (UMA), Umeå

Switzerland

Turkey
 Abant Izzet Baysal University Department of Architecture, Bolu
 Abdullah Gül University, Department of Architecture, Kayseri
 Akdeniz University, Fine Arts Faculty Department of Architecture, Antalya
 Antalya International University, School of Fine Arts and Architecture, Antalya
 Bahçeşehir University, Faculty of Architecture, Istanbul
Beykent University, Faculty of Architecture, Istanbul
 Dokuz Eylül University, Faculty of Architecture, Izmir
 Gazi University, Faculty of Architecture, Ankara
 Gediz University, Department of Architecture, İzmir
 Fatih Sultan Mehmet Vakıf University, Faculty of Architecture and Design, Istanbul
 Istanbul Arel University, Faculty of engineering and Architecture, Istanbul
 Istanbul Bilgi University, Faculty of Architecture, Istanbul
 Istanbul Kültür University, Faculty of Architecture, Istanbul
 Istanbul Medipol University, Fine Arts Design and Architecture, Istanbul
 Istanbul Technical University, Faculty of Architecture, Istanbul
 İzmir Institute of Technology, Faculty of Architecture, Izmir
 İzmir University of Economics, Faculty of Architecture, Izmir
 Karadeniz Technical University, Faculty of Architecture, Trabzon
Maltepe University, Faculty of Architecture, Istanbul
 Middle East Technical University, Faculty of Architecture, Ankara
 Mimar Sinan Fine Arts University, Faculty of Architecture, Istanbul
 Selçuk University, Department of Architecture, Konya
 TED University, Faculty of Architecture, Ankara
 Trakya University, Faculty of Architecture, Edirne
 Yaşar University, Faculty of Architecture,Izmir
 Yeditepe University, Faculty of Engineering and Architecture, Istanbul
 Yıldız Technical University, Faculty of Architecture, Istanbul

Ukraine
 Donbasska State Academy of Construction and Architecture, Faculty of Architecture, Makiivka
 Kharkiv National Academy of Urban Economy, Townplanning Faculty, Kharkiv
 Kharkiv State Technical University of Construction and Architecture, Faculty of Architecture, Kharkiv
 Kyiv National University of Construction and Architecture, Architectural Faculty, Kyiv
 National Academy of Fine Arts and Architecture, Faculty of Architecture, Kyiv
 National Academy of Nature Conservation and Resort's Construction, Architectural-Construction Faculty, Simferopol
 National University "Lvivska Politechnika", Institute of Architecture, Lviv
 Odessa State Academy of Construction and Architecture, Architectural and Art's Institute, Odessa
 Poltava National Technik University, Architectural Department, Poltava
 Prydniprovska State Academy of Civil Engineering and Architecture, Faculty of Architecture, Dnipro

United Kingdom

England 
 Anglia Ruskin University, Department of Engineering and Built Environment, Chelmsford
 Architectural Association School of Architecture, London
 Arts University Bournemouth, School of Architecture, Bournemouth
 Bartlett School of Architecture, Faculty of the Built Environment, University College London, London
 Birmingham City University, Birmingham School of Architecture and Design, Birmingham
 Canterbury School of Architecture, University for the Creative Arts, Canterbury
 Coventry University, School of Architecture, Coventry
 De Montfort University, The Leicester School of Architecture, Leicester
 Falmouth University, School of Architecture Design and Interiors.
 Hull College, Hull School of Art and Design, Hull
 Kent School of Architecture, University of Kent, Canterbury, Kent
 Kingston University, School of Architecture and Landscape, London
 Leeds Beckett University, Faculty of Arts, Environment and Technology, Leeds
 Liverpool John Moores University, Faculty of Media, Arts and Social Science Liverpool
 London Metropolitan University, School of Art, Architecture and Design, London
 London School of Architecture, London
 London South Bank University, Architecture and Design, South Bank, London
 Newcastle University, Newcastle University School of Architecture, Planning and Landscape, Faculty of Humanities and Social Sciences,  Newcastle upon Tyne
 Northumbria University, Department of Architecture and Built Environment, Newcastle upon Tyne
 Norwich University of the Arts, School of Architecture, Norwich
 Nottingham Trent University (NTU), School of Architecture, Design and the Built Environment, Nottingham
 Oxford School of Architecture, Oxford Brookes University, Oxford 
 Ravensbourne University London, Department of Architecture, Greenwich Peninsula, London
 Royal College of Art, School of Architecture, London
 The Manchester School of Architecture, Manchester 
 Sheffield Hallam University, Department of Architecture and Planning, Sheffield
 University of the Arts London, Central Saint Martins College of Art and Design
 University of Bath Department of Architecture and Civil Engineering, Bath 
 University of Brighton
 University of Cambridge, Department of Architecture, Cambridge
 University of Central Lancashire, The Grenfell-Baines School of Architecture, Preston
 University of East London, School of Architecture, Computing and Engineering, London
 University of Greenwich, Department of Architecture and Landscape, London
 University of Huddersfield, School of Art, Design and Architecture, Huddersfield
 University of Lincoln, Lincoln School of Architecture, Lincoln
 University of Lancaster, Lancaster School of Architecture, Lancaster
University of Liverpool, Liverpool University School of Architecture, Liverpool
 University of Nottingham, Department of Architecture and Built Environment, Nottingham
 University of Plymouth, School of Architecture, Design and Environment, Plymouth
 University of Portsmouth, UK
 University of Reading, School of Architecture, Reading, Berkshire
 University of Sheffield, Sheffield School of Architecture, Sheffield
 University of the West of England, Faculty of the Built Environment, Frenchay Campus, Bristol
 University of Westminster, School of Architecture and the Built Environment, Marylebone, London

Northern Ireland 
 Queens University of Belfast, School of Architecture
 The University of Ulster Architecture, School of Architecture, Belfast

Scotland 
 Dundee School of Architecture, University of Dundee, Dundee
 ESALA, Edinburgh School of Architecture and Landscape Architecture
 Mackintosh School of Architecture, Glasgow School of Art (University of Glasgow), Glasgow
 Robert Gordon University, The Scott Sutherland School of Architecture, Aberdeen
 University of Strathclyde, Faculty of Engineering, Department of Architecture, Strathclyde

Wales 
 Centre for Alternative Technology, Graduate School of the Environment, Machynlleth
 University of Wales Trinity Saint David, Faculty of Architecture, Computing and Engineering, Swansea
 Welsh School of Architecture, Cardiff University, Cardiff

North America

Canada

Alberta
 University of Calgary School of Architecture, Planning and Landscape, Calgary

British Columbia
 University of British Columbia School of Architecture and Landscape Architecture, Vancouver

Manitoba
 University of Manitoba Faculty of Architecture, Winnipeg

Nova Scotia
 Dalhousie University (formerly Technical University of Nova Scotia) Faculty of Architecture and Planning, Halifax

Ontario
 Carleton University, Azrieli School of Architecture and Urbanism, Ottawa
 Laurentian University, Faculty of Science, Engineering and Architecture, Greater Sudbury
 Toronto Metropolitan University, Faculty of Engineering, Architecture and Applied Science, Toronto
 University of Toronto, John H. Daniels Faculty of Architecture, Landscape and Design, Toronto
 University of Waterloo, School of Architecture, Cambridge

Quebec
 McGill University School of Architecture, Montreal
 Université de Montréal, Faculté de l'aménagement, Montréal
 Université Laval, École d'Architecture, Faculté d'aménagement, d'architecture et des arts visuels

Mexico
 CEDIM, Centro de Estudios Superiores de Diseño de Monterrey, S.C., Departamento de Arquitectura
 Instituto Superior de Arquitectura y Diseño (ISAD), Chihuahua, Mexico
 ITESM, Carrera de Arquitectura
 ITESO, Instituto Tecnologico de Estudios Superiores de Occidente
 UDG, Universidad de Guadalajara, Centro Universitario de Arte, Arquitectura y Diseño
 UG, Universidad de Guanajuato, Departamento de Arquitectura
 UIA, Universidad Iberoamericana, Departamento de Arquitectura
 UNAM, Facultad de Arquitectura, Mexico City
 UADY, Faculty of Architecture – Facultad de Arquitectura, Mérida, Yucatán
 UANL, Univestidad Autónoma de Nuevo León, Facultad de Arquitectura
 UA, Universidad Anáhuac Mexico Norte, Departamento de Arquitectura
 Universidad Autonoma the Guadalajara (UAG)
 Universidad de las Americas Puebla (UDLAP), Departamento de Arquitectura
 Universidad de Monterrey, Universidad de Monterrey, Departamento de Arquitectura

Puerto Rico
 Escuela de Arquitectura de la Pontificia Universidad Católica de Puerto Rico, Ponce, Puerto Rico

United States

Central America

Costa Rica
 Costa Rica Institute of Technology, Escuela de Arquitectura y Urbanismo, Campus San José, San José
 Universidad Autónoma de Centro América, Curridabat
 Universidad Central de Costa Rica, Escuela de Ingenierías y Arquitectura, Barrio Escalante
 Universidad Creativa de Costa Rica
 University of Costa Rica, Escuela de Arquitectura, San José
 Universidad de las Ciencias y el Arte, facultad de Diseño, San José
 Universidad Hispanoamericana, Escuela de Arquitectura, Barrio Escalante
 Universidad Interamericana, Facultad de Ingeniería y Arquitectura, Heredia, Costa Rica|Heredia
 Universidad Internacional de las Américas, Facultad de Ingeniería y Arquitectura, San José
 Universidad Latina de Costa Rica, Facultad de Ingeniería y Arquitectura
 Universidad Latinoamericana de las Ciencias y la Tecnología, Facultad de Ingenierías y Arquitectura, Escuela de Arquitectura
 Universidad Veritas, Escuela de Arte, Diseño y Arquitectura

Cuba
 Instituto Superior Politecnico de Julio Antonio Mella
 Jose Antonio Echeverria Higher Technical University
 Universidad Central Marta Abreu de las Villas, Facultad de Arquitectura

Dominican Republic
 Pontifica Universidad Católica Madre y Maestra
 Universidad Autónoma de Santo Domingo
 Universidad Católica Nordestana
 Universidad Central del Este
 Universidad Dominicana O & M
 Universidad Iberoamericana
 Universidad Nacional Pedro Henríquez Ureña
 Universidad Tecnológica de Santiago
 Instituto Nacional de Ciencias Exactas
 Universidad Católica del Cibao

El Salvador
 Universidad Albert Einstein
 Universidad Católica de El Salvador
 Universidad Centroamericana José Simeon Cañas
 Universidad de El Salvador
 Universidad de Oriente
 Universidad Dr. José Matías Delgado
 Universidad Francisco Gavidia
 Universidad Gerardo Barrios
 Universidad Politécnica de El Salvador
 Universidad Tecnológica de El Salvador

Guatemala
 Universidad de San Carlos de Guatemala
 Universidad del Istmo
 Universidad Francisco Marroquín
 Universidad Mariano Galvez
 Universidad Mesoamericana
 Universidad Rafael Landívar

Honduras
 Universidad Nacional Autónoma de Honduras, Campus Tegucigalpa
 Universidad José Cecilio Del Valle
 Universidad Católica de Honduras
 Universidad de San Pedro Sula
 Universidad Tecnologica Centroamericana
Centro de Diseño, Arquitectura y Construcción (CEDAC)

Nicaragua
 Universidad Católica REDEMPTORIS MATER
 Universidad Centroamericana 
 Universidad del Valle
 Universidad Iberoamericana de Ciencia y Tecnología 
 Universidad Nacional de Ingeniería

Panama
 Columbus University, Escuela de Arquitectura
 Isthmus, Escuela de Arquitectura y Diseño de América Latina y el Caribe
 Quality Leadership University
 Universidad Católica Santa María la Antigua, Escuela de Diseño
 Universidad de Panamá, Facultad de Arquitectura, Escuela de Arquitectura
 Universidad Autónoma de Chiriquí, Facultad de Arquitectura http://www.unachi.ac.pa
 Universidad Interamericana de Panamá, Facultad de Ingenierías y Arquitectura, Escuela de Arquitectura
 Universidad Tecnológica de Panamá, Escuela de Ingenierías

South America

Argentina
 Universidad Argentina John F. Kennedy, Escuela de Arquitectura, Buenos Aires
 Universidad Blas Pascal, Facultad de Arquitectura, Córdoba
 Universidad Católica de Córdoba, Facultad de Arquitectura, Córdoba
 Universidad Católica de La Plata, Facultad de Arquitectura y Diseño, La Plata
 Universidad Católica de Salta, Facultad de Arquitectura y Urbanismo, Salta
 Universidad Católica de Santa Fe, Facultad de Arquitectura y Diseño, Santa Fe
 Universidad de Belgrano, Facultad de Arquitectura y Urbanismo, Belgrano
 Universidad de Buenos Aires, Facultad de Arquitectura, Diseño y Urbanismo, Buenos Aires
 Universidad de Flores, Facultad de Planeamiento Socio-Ambiental, Buenos Aires, Cipolletti
 Universidad de Mendoza, Facultad de Arquitectura, Urbanismo y Diseño, Mendoza/
 Universidad de Moron, Facultad de Arquitectura, Diseño, Arte y Urbanismo, Moron
 Universidad Nacional de Córdoba, Facultad de Arquitectura, Urbanismo y Diseño, Córdoba
 Universidad Nacional de La Plata, Facultad de Arquitectura y Urbanismo, La Plata
 Universidad Nacional de Mar del Plata, Facultad de Arquitectura, Urbanismo y Diseño, Mar Del Plata
 Universidad de Palermo, Facultad de Arquitectura, Buenos Aires
 Universidad Nacional de Rosario, Facultad de Arquitectura, Planeamiento y Diseño, Rosario
 Universidad Nacional de San Juan, Facultad de Arquitectura, San Juan
 Universidad Nacional de Tucumán, Facultad de Arquitectura y Urbanismo, Tucumán
 Universidad Nacional del Litoral, Facultad de Arquitectura, Diseño y Urbanismo, Santa Fe
 Universidad Nacional del Nordeste, Facultad de Arquitectura y Urbanismo Resistencia, Chaco
 Universidad Torcuato di Tella, Escuela de Arquitectura y Estudios Urbanos, Buenos Aires

Brazil

 Centro Universitário Belas Artes de São Paulo, CUBASP, São Paulo
 Centro Universitário Izabela Hendrix, Belo Horizonte
 Escola da Cidade, AEAUSP, São Paulo
 Pontifícia Universidade Católica do Rio Grande do Sul, PUC-RS
 Universidade de Brasília, UnB, Faculdade de Arquitetura e Urbanismo, Brasília
 Universidade de Fortaleza, UNIFOR, Fortaleza
 Universidade de São Paulo, USP, Faculdade de Arquitetura e Urbanismo, São Paulo
Centro Universitário Filadélfia – UNIFIL, Londrina, Paraná, 
 Universidade do Vale do Rio dos Sinos, UNISINOS
 Universidade Estadual de Campinas, UNICAMP, Faculdade de Engenharia Civil, Arquitetura e Urbanismo, Campinas
 Universidade Estadual de Londrina (UEL)
 Universidade Estadual Paulista Júlio de Mesquita Filho, UNESP
 Universidade Federal de Minas Gerais, UFMG, Faculdade de Arquitetura e Urbanismo, Belo Horizonte
 Universidade Federal de Pernambuco, UFPE
 Universidade Federal de Santa Catarina- UFSC
 Universidade Federal de Uberlândia (UFU)
 Universidade Federal de Viçosa (UFV)
 Universidade Federal do Ceará, UFC, Curso de Arquitetura e Urbanismo, Fortaleza
 Universidade Federal do Espírito Santo, UFES
 Universidade Federal do Pará, UFPA
 Universidade Federal do Paraná, UFPR
 Universidade Federal do Rio de Janeiro, UFRJ, Faculdade de Arquitetura e Urbanismo, Rio de Janeiro
 Universidade Federal do Rio Grande do Sul, UFRGS
 Universidade Presbiteriana Mackenzie, UPM, Faculdade de Arquitetura e Urbanismo, São Paulo
 Universidade São Francisco, USF, Curso de Arquitetura e Urbanismo, Itatiba
 Universidade Tecnológica Federal do Paraná, UTFPR

Chile
 Pontificia Universidad Católica de Chile Facultad de Arquitectura, Diseño y Estudios Urbanos
 Pontificia Universidad Católica de Valparaíso Escuela de Arquitectura y Diseño
 Universidad Católica del Norte Escuela de Arquitectura
 Universidad de Chile Facultad de Arquitectura y Urbanismo, Santiago
 Universidad Técnica Federico Santa María Departamento de Arquitectura

Colombia
 Pontificia Universidad Javeriana, Bogotá, Facultad de Arquitectura y Diseño
 Universidad Catolica de Colombia, Facultad de Arquitectura, RIBA Accredited Program, Bogota
 Universidad de America, Facultad de Arquitectura y Urbanismo, Bogota
 Universidad de Boyacá, Facultad de Arquitectura y Bellas Artes, Programa de Arquitectura, Especialización en Diseño Urbano, Maestría en Urbanismo, Tunja, Boyacá
 Universidad de Ibagué, Facultad de Humanidades, Programa de Arquitectura
 Universidad de La Salle, Colombia, Universidad de La Salle, Facultad Facultad de Ciencias del Hábitat, Bogota
 Universidad Nacional de Colombia, Faculatad de Artes, Escuela de Arquitectura y Urbanismo, Bogota
 Universidad Piloto De Colombia, Faculdad de Arquitectura y Artes, Programa de Arquitectura
 Universidad Pontificia Bolivariana, Facultad de Arquitectura y Diseño, Medellín
Arquitectura
 Universidad San Buenaventura, Facultad de Arquitectura
 Universidad Santo Tomas, Facultad de Arquitectura, Tunja
 Universidad de los Andes, Universidad de los Andes, Facultad de arquitectura y diseno, Bogotá
 University of Valle, Facultad de Artes Integradas, Escuela de Arquitectura, Cali
 University la Gran Colombia, Facultad de arquitectura, Bogotá

Ecuador
 Central University of Ecuador, School of Architecture and Urbanism, Quito
 Pontificia Universidad Católica del Ecuador, Facultad de Arquitectura, Diseño y Artes, Quito
 Universidad Católica de Santiago de Guayaquil, Guayaquil, Facultad de Arquitectura y Diseño Guayaquil
 Universidad de Cuenca, Cuenca, Ecuador, Facultad de Arquitectura
 Universidad San Francisco de Quito, Facultad de Arquitectura y Diseño Interior, Cumbaya, Quito

Perú 
 Universidad Peruana de Ciencias Applicadas, Facultad de Arquitectura, Lima
 Pontificia Universidad Católica del Perú, Facultad de Arquitectura y Urbanismo, Lima
 Universidad Nacional de Ingeniería Facultad de Arquitectura, Urbanismo y Artes, Lima
 Universidad Nacional de San Antonio Abad del Cusco Facultad de Arquitectura y Artes Plásticas, Cusco
 Universidad Ricardo Palma, Facultad de Arquitectura y Urbanismo

Uruguay
 Universidad de la República, Facultad de Arquitectura, Montevideo
 Universidad ORT, Facultad de Arquitectura, Montevideo

Venezuela
 Instituto Universitario Politecnico Santiago Mariño, Maracaibo, Cabimas, Ciudad Ojeda, Barinas, Mérida, San Cristobal, Caracas, Valencia, Maracay, Barcelona, Maturín, Puerto Ordaz y Porlamar,  Facultad De Arquitectura
 Facultad de Arquitectura y Urbanismo de la Universidad Central de Venezuela en Caracas
 Facultad de Arquitectura de la Universidad Santa María en Caracas
 Escuela de Arquitectura de la Universidad Simon Bolivar en Caracas
 Facultad de Arquitectura y Urbanismo de la Universidad de Los Andes en Mérida
 Facultad de Arquitectura y Diseño de la Universidad del Zulia en Maracaibo
 Facultad de Arquitectura y Urbanismo de la Universidad de Carabobo en Valencia

Oceania

Australia

New Zealand
 Unitec New Zealand, architecture and landscape, Auckland
 University of Auckland, National Institute of Creative Arts and Industries, School of Architecture and Planning, Auckland
 Victoria University of Wellington, School of Architecture, Wellington
 Ara Institute of Canterbury, Bachelor of Architectural Studies (Architectural Technology), Christchurch

References

External links
 vitruvio.ch Architectural schools in the world
Top Architecture Universities in the UK
 World's best architecture schools